Aeschbacher, sometimes spelled Äschbacher, is a surname. People with this surname include:

 Adrian Aeschbacher (1912–2002), Swiss pianist; son of Carl, brother of Niklaus
 Carl Aeschbacher (1886–1944), Swiss composer; father of Adrian and Niklaus
 Hans Aeschbacher (1906–1980), Swiss sculptor
 Marianne Aeschbacher (b. 1970), French former synchronized swimmer
 Niklaus Aeschbacher (1917–1995), Swiss conductor; son of Carl, brother of Adrian
 Walther Aeschbacher (1901–1969), Swiss conductor and composer

See also
 Michael Aschbacher (born 1944), American mathematician with a similar name

Swiss-German surnames